Su Chih-fen (born 10 July 1953) is a Taiwanese politician. She was the Magistrate of Yunlin County from 20 December 2005 until 25 December 2014.

Yunlin County Magistrate

Yunlin County Magistrate election
Su was elected as the Magistrate of Yunlin County after winning the 2005 Republic of China local election under Democratic Progressive Party on 3 December 2005 and assumed office on 20 December 2005. She secured her second term as the magistrate after winning the 2009 Republic of China local election on 5 December 2009 and assumed her second-term office on 20 December 2009.

Landfill approval project bribery
During her term as the Yunlin County Commissioner, Su was arrested on 3 November 2008 on the charge of accepting bribes to the worth NT$5 million, equivalent to US$174,845.00, in a landfill approval case and was under prosecution for a 15-year jail sentence. Known for her great integrity, the news of her arrest triggered off a widespread public outrage. The court, however, ruled out her case and returned the verdict as not guilty.

2013 cross-strait service trade agreement
Commenting on the Cross-Strait Service Trade Agreement signed between Straits Exchange Foundation (SEF) and Association for Relations Across the Taiwan Straits (ARATS) in Shanghai on 21 June 2013, Su said that she refused to recognize the agreement and implement it in Yunlin County.

References

Living people
1953 births
Yunlin County Members of the Legislative Yuan
Members of the 5th Legislative Yuan
Democratic Progressive Party Members of the Legislative Yuan
Members of the 9th Legislative Yuan
Magistrates of Yunlin County
Members of the 10th Legislative Yuan